Australia was the host nation for the 2000 Summer Paralympics which was held in Sydney. Australia competed in the games between 18 and 29 October. The team consisted of 285 athletes in 18 sports with 148 officials. It was the country's largest ever Paralympic delegation to a Games. Australia has participated at every Summer Paralympic Games since its inception. Australia finished at the top of the medal tally with 63 gold, 39 silver and 47 bronze medals to total 149 medals for the games. This was the first time and the only time to date that Australia has finished on top of either an Olympic or Paralympic medal tally.

The most successful sports were athletics, cycling, equestrian, swimming and wheelchair tennis. As one of the sporting events, sailing involved the implementation of forecasting systems and services in Sydney Harbour, in addition to the recruitment of professionals to design the project’s plans and processes. This occurred in order to fulfil the requirements of both event organisers, competitors and visitors.

Notable Australian performances were:
 Siobhan Paton won six gold medals in S14 swimming events and set six world records
 Timothy Sullivan won five gold medals and set five world records in athletics
 Neil Fuller, a leg amputee sprinter, won four gold medals and one bronze medal and was flag bearer at the closing ceremony
 Lisa Llorens won three gold medals and one silver medal in athletics
 Greg Smith in wheelchair athletics events won three gold medals
 Lisa McIntosh won three gold medals in athletics
 Athletes who won two individual gold medals were: Louise Sauvage, Russell Short, Amy Winters, Julie Higgins, Kingsley Bugarin, and Gemma Dashwood.
Ultimately, this event has historically influenced The Australian Paralympic Movement and has present impacts on the social development of the Australian nation and its disabled community. Noting the access and disability challenges experienced prior to and during the Games, the outcomes of central organisational bodies responsible for devising and executing plans associated with this have been reviewed. Following the announcement of Sydney being the host city for the 2000 Olympic and Paralympic Games on 23 September 1993, the NSW Government established central organisations and bodies to distribute the workload, responsibilities and eventually, allocated funding based on this.

Context

The games were the eleventh Summer Paralympics since its commencement in 1960. The opening ceremony took place on 18 October, followed by eleven days of intense competition. As the hosting nation, Sydney implemented a number of conservation and environmental education actions. The dedication to water saving techniques during both the Olympic and Paralympic games led to praise from the International Paralympic Committee. Many held the organization of the games in high esteem. This success was attributed to the coordination between the Sydney Paralympic Organising Committee and the Sydney Organising Committee for the Olympic Games.

The Mascot for the games was 'Lizzie' the frill-neck lizard, a well-known Australian animal. The voice for 'Lizzie' was Olivia Newton-John, singer and actor. 'Lizzie' was well marketed and considered a successful iconic representation of the Sydney Paralympic games.

Australia topped the medal count for the first time in games history, with a total of 149 medals. Notable performances from the Australian team include Siobhan Paton (swimming) with six gold medals, Tim Sullivan (track and field) with five gold medals and Matthew Gray (cycling) with two gold medals.

Background
Several Australian venues were used to host the Sydney 2000 Paralympic games. Listed below are the main locations and a brief description of the events at each:
 Anne Clark Netball Centre, Lidcombe – Volleyball (Sitting & Standing), 
 Dunc Gray Velodrome, Bass Hill – Cycling, 
 Equestrian Centre, Horsley Park – Equestrian, 
 Exhibition Halls, Darling Harbour – Judo, Wheelchair Fencing,
 Sailing Marina, Rushcutters Bay – Sailing
 Shooting Centre, Cecil Park – Shooting
 Sydney Olympic Park – Archery, Athletics, Basketball (Wheelchair & Intellectually Disabled), Boccia, Football, Goalball, Powerlifting, Swimming, Table Tennis, Wheelchair Rugby, Wheelchair Tennis.  
Huge crowds were drawn to these locations, namely some 340 000 school children. Schools were provided with free day tickets for students to attend, promoting the major schools education project which ran alongside the games. The Sydney Olympic Games Organising Committee (SOCOG) and the Sydney Paralympic Organising Committee (SPOC) held an administrative and organisational partnership to deliver three months of festivals including the Olympic Games, Paralympics Games and cultural festival. This partnership alleviated transitional issues present at the 1996 Atlanta games, due to cross involvement between the committees at all events.

The Prime Minister at the time, Mr John Howard wished the team good luck and said:
"Their gold medal tally at Atlanta was second only and our team in Sydney next year will be the largest and strongest ever."

Howard mentioned during his speech that the government has provided the athletes with A$5.5 million to prepare for the games. The Australian Paralympic team launch took place during Paralympic Week. There were a number of other events prior to the commencement of the games including the launch of the formal uniforms at the museum of contemporary art and the Nike launch where both Olympic and Paralympic athletes modelled side by side.

Team
There were 285 athletes participating in 18 sports. The Australian team had the largest number of athletes with an intellectual disability, a total of 30. Brendan Burkett, Australian Paralympic swimmer was the opening ceremony flag bearer and Neil Fuller, Australian Paralympic athletics medalist was the closing ceremony flag bearer. Australian athlete Louise Sauvage lit the Paralympic Cauldron at the opening ceremony.

The Chef de Mission was Paul Bird, a Paralympic medalist in 1980 and 1984. He was supported by four assistant Chef de Missions; Keith Gilbert, Greg Campbell, Tony Naar and Robyn Smith.

Medalists

| width="22%" align="left" valign="top" |

Archery

Australia represented in archery by:

Coaches – Robert de Bondt (Head), Hans Klar

Australia failed to win any medals.

Athletics

Australia represented in athletics by:

Coaches – Chris Nunn (Head), Di Barnes, Andrew Dawes, Scott Goodman, Brett Jones, Peter Negropontis, Lorraine Feddema, Robyn Hanson, Phil Badman, Rob Gorringe

Officials – Jason Hellwig (Manager), Hayden Clark, Barb Denson, Petrina Tierney, Jodie Worrall, Allyson Richards, Bill Hunter, Rick Cooke

Australia finished the number one country in athletics with 35 gold, 15 silver and 16 bronze medals. This was Australia's best performance in athletics at the Paralympics. Team highlights included: Timothy Sullivan's five gold medals, Greg Smith's five gold medals, Neil Fuller's four gold medals and one bronze medal, Lisa Llorens's three gold medals and one silver medal and Lisa McIntosh's three gold medals. Australia also won four relay gold medals.

Controversy 
Well known Australian team member and opening ceremony cauldron lighter Louise Sauvage was a participant in the 800 meters T54 event. The race was interrupted by a crash around the 200m mark, leaving three competitors unable to finish. Race leaders Sauvage and Canadian rival Chantal Petitclerc were uninterrupted by the incident, with Petitclerc finishing first, followed by Sauvage in second. Video footage was reviewed by race referee Reg Brandis, and it was determined the competitors involved in the crash were significantly disadvantaged in their opportunity to win a medal. Two hours after the event a re-race was ordered after the final result was declared void. Andrew Dawes, coach of Sauvauge was quoted as saying,"If she comes out and wins, people will say that she got a second bit at the cherry. And if she loses, she has lost twice."In later events, Sauvage went on to win gold in the 1500m and 5000m, beating her rival Petitclerc.

Basketball (Intellectual Disability)

Australia represented in basketball by:

Coaches – Tony Guihot (Head), Liz Fraser, Ian McLeod 
Officials – Michael Hudson (Manager)

The Australian team known as the 'Boomerangs' finished sixth in the tournament.

Controversy

The Spanish intellectually disabled basketball team beat Russia 87-63 to win the gold medal match. This win was later contended as a full investigation into the team was conducted due to accusations of fraud. It was later discovered that 10 of the 12 players were not disabled and that this deception was committed intentionally.

The IPC conducted a major investigation into the INAS-FID registration cards for all 244 athletes who participated in the Sydney games. A number of issues were discovered resulting in athletes with an intellectual disability being suspended from all IPC activities. The ban heavily affected the future Australian team as a large number of medals won during the Sydney games were by ID athletes. It was not until a meeting on 9 March 2001, where the IPC Executive Committee approved five resolutions pertaining to future participation. Unfortunately, it was concluded that these parameters would not be sufficient to expel cheating from the games and ID competitions were banned indefinitely. After the 2008 Paralympic games, a more robust criterion had been decided upon and the ban on intellectually disabled athletes lifted.

Boccia

Australia represented in boccia by:

Coaches – Joan Stevens (Head), Italo Vigalo 
Officials – Peggy Richardson, Barry Stewart, Sue Beencke, Annette Low, Emily Connell, Carla Brearley, June Kaese

Most athletes did not progress from the first round of pool games. Scott Eslworth was the best performed athlete making the quarter-finals.

Cycling

 Australia represented in cycling by:

Coaches – Kevin McIntosh (Head), Darryl Benson, Radek Valenta 
Officials – Elsa Lepore (Manager), John Beer, Rebecca Tweedy

Australia won 10 gold, 3 silver and 8 bronze medals and finished the number one country overall.

Equestrian

Australia represented in equestrian by:

Coaches – Carolyn Lieutenant (Head), Gillian Rickard Officials – Judy Cubitt (Chef d'Equipe), Dinah Barron

Australia won 2 gold and 2 bronze medals in its second Paralympic competition. It came second to Great Britain in the overall medal tally. Due to the team's results, Head Coach Carolyn Lieutenant won the Australian Coaching Council's Female Coach of the Year award.

Fencing

Australia represented in wheelchair fencing by:

Coach Sally Kopiec (Head)

Australia did not win any medals but each athlete made the second round (top sixteen).

Football (7 a Side)

Australia represented in football by:

Coaches – Russell Marriott (Head), David Campbell

Officials – Corny van Eldik (Manager)

The team known as the 'Drillers' finished seventh in their first Paralympics.

Goalball

Australia represented in goalball by:

Men – Coaches – Sam Theodore (Head), Robert Apps

Women – Coaches – Terry Kenaghan (Head)

The men's team finished ninth out of twelve and the women's team finished eighth.

Judo

Australia represented in judo by:

Coach – Trevor Kschamer (Head)

Australia's sole competitor Anthony Clarke, a former gold medalist, finished seventh.

Powerlifting

Australia represented in powerlifting by:

Coaches – Blagoi Blagoev (Head), Ray Epstein

Australia won a silver medal with Richard Nicholson's performance.

Sailing

Australia represented in sailing by:

Coaches – Lachlan Gilbert (2.4mR), Paul Eldrid (Sonar)

Officials – John Whitfield

Australia won the gold medal in the Sonar event and finished fourth in 2.4MR. It was the second placed nation in sailing.

The role of the Australian Bureau of Meteorology (ABM) was to be the "official provider of weather services", by providing specifically tailored services to the participants, spectators and event organisers for both the Olympic and Paralympic Games. Based on the requests of the SOCOG sailing management team, the sailing events were prioritised in terms of forecasting effort, in comparison to the other events and their respective venues. 

The sailing events were hosted at the Sydney Harbour venue, as well as the offshore region adjacent to the entrance of the harbour. Due to its detailed and complex topography, this entire region experienced certain challenges in relation to the forecasting of surface winds. This included variations in wind speed and direction between "different reaches of the harbour", which occurred because of local sea to harbour and terrain circulations. Another challenge that was identified centred around the accuracy of the resolution required for wind forecasting being beyond the scope of the Australian operational numerical weather prediction (NWP) models of implementation. As a result of these factors, various statistical tools were developed to support the NWP output, and forecasts were provided across "three different harbour locations" in addition to a region offshore. 

The statistical models utilised in preparation for and during the event, were NWP-based and high in resolution. The two models were one named LAPS 05 and one that only operated at 1-km and 5-km resolutions, and was a contribution made by the University of New South Wales Centre for Environmental Modelling and Prediction (CEMAP) that was available at 5-km and 1-km resolutions contribution made by the University. Alongside these statistical models, a further five were incorporated to facilitate the forecasting process in targeting these "small-scale wind variations". Following this, the evaluation of each model’s prediction skill was conducted, by drawing a comparison between the predicted data and data obtained via observation. This comparison was made mathematically, by using statistical indices which included the root-mean-square (RMS) error, "wind bearing error, magnitude of vector error", square error and Brier Skill score.

The Games marked the first event, where any member of the public and all the athletes participating were granted access to all the forecasting information that was specifically delivered to the organisers. The Bureau of Meteorology’s website was developed to provide both the event participants and their coaches with access to weather data. An Australian team of meteorologists was formed and made responsible for "interpreting the output" of an array of statistical and NWP models. Weather advice was provided by forecasters two weeks in advance to the Games beginning, during the training period and during the sailing test events conducted in 1999 and 1999. Hourly updates were provided in the form of site-specific forecasts for wave displacements and surface winds across various course locations, and the sail management team located in key boats present at the venue, was equipped with "onboard laptops" which were used to transmit the most updated weather information.

It has been revealed that the ABM received "numerous tributes" in relation to the "quality of its services", from SOCOG, individual athletes, meteorologists who were part of the sailing team, web clients and the International Sailing Federation (ISAF). Additionally, a meteorology team member shared that he was "impressed by the services available to athletes". However, he also expressed that the quality of these services was not consistent in its delivery to the organisers, and suggested that the service providers increase their focus on strongly interacting with "all client groups" when providing "future Olympics weather services".

Shooting

Australia represented in shooting by:

Coaches – Yvonne Hill (Head), Anne Bugden, Evangelos Anagnostou Officials – Andre Jurich

Australia won a silver medal with Peter Tait's performance in the pistol. Six shooters made finals.

Swimming

Australia represented in swimming by:

Coaches – Matthew Brown (Head), Greg Rochowcyzk, John Ornsby, Wanda Smales, Brendan Keogh, Frank Hohmann, Trent Patten, Dick Orbell Officials – Michael Scott (Manager), Linda Garsden, John Stamoulos, Michael Martin, Jenny Lambert

Australia had its largest ever swimming team and it won 14 gold, 15 silver and 21 bronze medals. It finished fifth on the gold medal tally and second on the overall medal tally. During the competition, Australian swimmers set 42 Australian records, 14 Paralympic records and 7 world records.

Table Tennis

Australia represented in table tennis by:

Coaches – Joe Hoad (Head) Officials – Carmel Medley and Roger Massie

Australia was given two wild card entries due to it being the host nation. It did not win any medals as no athlete progressed past the first round.

Volleyball

Australia represented in volleyball by:

Sitting

Coaches – Weiping Tu, Glenn Stewart Officials – Graham Golley (Manager)

The team known as the 'Crabs' finished eleventh out of twelve but had their first ever international victory by defeating the United States.StandingCoaches – Kieron Rochester (Head), Gary Jenness

The team known as the 'Volleyroos' finished eighth. At the end of the tournament, the International Paralympic Committee determined that the sport would not be part of the 2004 Athens Games due to it failing to meet IPC criteria.

Wheelchair Basketball

Australia represented in wheelchair basketball by:

Women's tournamentGroup A Results and StandingsSemi-finalAustralia 45 defeated Japan 33Gold Medal MatchCanada 46 defeated Australia 27

Men's tournamentGroup B Results and StandingsSource: Paralympic.org Quarter-finalsUnited States 62 defeated Australia 52Fifth to Eight PlayoffsAustralia 61 defeated Germany 53Fifth - Sixth PlayoffAustralia 50 defeated France 47

The men's team known as the 'Rollers' lost their quarter-final to the United States and finished fifth. The women's team known as 'Gliders' won the silver medal after losing to Canada in the final. It was their most successful Paralympics.

Wheelchair Rugby

 Australia represented in wheelchair rugby by:Coaches – Terry Vinyard (Head), Glenn Stephens, Nicholas Bailey Officials – Kim Elwood (Manager), David Bonavita (Chief Mechanic), Wendy Poole

The team known as the 'Steelers' won the silver medal after losing to the World and Paralympic champions, United States by one point in the final.Group A Results and StandingsSemi-finals 
 Australia 40 defeated New Zealand 39Gold Medal Match United States 32 defeated Australia 31

Wheelchair Tennis

Australia represented in wheelchair tennis by:Coach – Greg Crump (Head)

Australia had very impressive results making three finals out of four and winning 1 gold and 2 silver medals. David Hall took home one gold and one silver medal.

Administration and support
Members of the headquarters team were:AdministrationPaul Bird ( Chef de Mission), Keith Gilbert (Assistant Chef de Mission), Greg Campbell (Assistant Chef de Mission), Tony Naar (Assistant Chef de Mission), Robyn Smith (Assistant Chef de Mission), John Watkins, Rod Anderson, Melinda Richards, Eve Bampfield, Carmel Williams, Graham Edwards, Rodney Nugent, Anne Brunnell, Rebecca Hill, Dianne Watson, Shona Halson, Andrea Davidson, Nadia Brandon-Black, Murray Lydeamore, Karen Hellwig, Louise Mogg, Simon Reffold, Jillian Lennon, Joel Lipman, Kellie Urquhart, Jenni Banks, Tracy Lawrence, Ross Boyd, Sharon Palmer, Michael Blucher, Peter Kelly, Victoria Carthew, Sally Nelson, Phyllis SakinofskyAustralia Medical Staff'''

Jane Buckley (Director), David Millions, Kevin Boundy, Syd Bourke, Kathy Merlehan, Jenny Nucifora, Craig Boettcher, Greg Ungerer, Mark Stokes, David Spurrier, Dimi Argyros, Allan Thomas, Joann Marr, Maria Di Michele, Vicki de Prazer, Gavin Freeman, John Woods

 Community links and volunteers 
The SPOC identified the importance of reaching out the community in order to develop community awareness of the games, and to improve community relations. To achieve this, Community Support Programs were developed by the SPOC in 1998 and included partnership programs, a national education program, Ride 2000 and sports demonstrations. The aims of these initiatives were to "establish links with multicultural communities, service groups, local community events and disability groups to enhance community support"'One of the initiatives from the SPOC in partnership with the NSW Department of Education and Training (DET), was the introduction of a new curriculum to schools called 'Set no limits'. The package involved an official school excursion to the Paralympic Games for Australian school children, and included the official mascot of the games, 'Lizzie' the frill neck lizard. The National Education Program (NEP) aimed for school children to understand how to be more tolerant, however no official measures of attitudes were evaluated.

Demonstrations of disability sport were also conducted at Australian schools, shopping centres and other public events. These demonstrations were organised by the SPOC and APC, and included popular Paralympic sports such as wheelchair basketball and wheelchair rugby. The appearances of the Australian team athletes in these demonstrations was originally volunteer and un-paid, however later a fee of $500 was negotiated per appearance.

Rides 2000 was another community awareness initiative developed by Sue-Ellen Lovett, an equestrian rider and director of the Sydney 2000 Paralympic Games Board. During this time Lovett participated in long distance rides to regional Australia in order to raise awareness of, and funds for the Paralympic Games. The rides included: 
 1997: Melbourne to Sydney 
 1998: Brisbane to Sydney 
 1999: Adelaide to Sydney 
 2000: Moree to Sydney 
These 'community support programs' assisted in raising community awareness in the lead up to the games. For these reasons, and also due to the success of the previous Olympic games, a 'party atmosphere' was created which continued into the Paralympic games. This attracted numerous spectators to the games, including new groups joining the 'Paralympic party'. These groups encompassed "those who were critical of the Olympics but supported the Paralympics as it was not perceived as a corporatised event", seniors and also school children who could not afford the Olympic Games.

The Australian Government at the time also showed political support of the games. A post-Games dinner was held including 70 parliamentarians, that aimed to ensure continual government and private funding for the games in years to come. Former Deputy Leader of the Federal Coalition, Tim Fischer was also involved in the Games, overseeing the Paralympic Village in the role of mayor.

The community was also involved in the games through volunteer roles. The partnership between the SPOC and SOCOG lead to 15,000 volunteers being recruited for the Paralympic games. Volunteers were trained by Technical and Further Education (TAFE) New South Wales (NSW). The volunteers participated in a range of disability awareness training activities in preparation for the games. It was also noted that a "larger number of volunteers had disabilities themselves, highlighting the accessibility of all aspects of the venues and overlay". Two incidents were reported where volunteers felt discriminated against as they had a disability.

Media coverage and operations
It's estimated that approximately 3.9 billion people viewed the Sydney Paralympic Games, across 220 countries. Australian commercial television station Channel 7 paid $45 million for the rights to broadcast the games, however later declined to do so as it regarded the investment too high risk. Simon Thomas, the SPOC's senior television manager was quoted as saying: "There were several fundamental issues [that] we never got very close to resolving [with Channel 7] and in the end it was a mutual agreement to go our separate ways."Later, it was decided that Australian national broadcaster, ABC, would broadcast the games on ABC local radio and on ABC television. ABC had previous experience covering the Paralympics in 1992 and 1996. The television coverage included 40 hours of live action, with 2 hours per weekday and 20 hours on the grandstand program during both weekends. Over a total of 17 days, there were more than 8 million Metropolitan viewers and almost 4 million Regional viewers. The opening and closing ceremonies placed in the top 20 ABC most popular programs for the season. The ABC sports also set up an interactive website, with quizzes, athlete profiles and results.

The relationship between the SOCOG and the SPOC resulted in providing improved media coverage for both the Olympics and Paralympics. Media operations were planned to limit the potential for complaint by both local Australian and overseas media, to result in better Paralympic Games reviews. This approach by Australian media was taken in response to the previous limitations of the Atlanta Paralympics. Australia was heavily involved in the media coverage of the Paralympics, namely through the role of volunteers.

The table below outlines the staffing numbers of the Media Centre at the Olympics and Paralympics respectively:

The Main Media Centre (MMC) for the Paralympics opened on 11 October, and from 18–29 October ran 24 hours a day. Coupled with the MMC was a research and information office, including a library run by Wayne Peak, the SOCOG Communications officer. Staff from the Centre for Olympic Studies at the University of New South Wales also assisted the running of the library. WeMedia provided internet coverage of the games, and was a sponsor and partner of the Sydney Paralympics. During the games, WeMedia had 300 staff operating in the MMC. Creative production of the WeMedia webcast was led by Jason Snyder. The official broadcaster of the games ABC, had a comparatively smaller team of 30 for its television coverage.

Australian Paralympic Movement

Through increased media coverage and community support, the Australian athletes who participated at the 2000 Summer Paralympic games have left a lasting impression. Future Paralympians and the APC are left with the gift of a legacy from these athletes. Information into the attitude towards the Paralympics was sought through the APC in conjunction with Woolcott Research over a two-year period. The statistics are listed below:

 93% of Australians believe Paralympic athletes are elite and train as hard as able-bodied athletes
 87% of Australians believe they should receive equal or more funding than Olympic athletes
 71% of Australians want to know personal stories about the athletes
 72% of Australians believe that Paralympic athletes do not receive the attention deserved to them

The success of the Australian Paralympic team during the 2000 Summer games paves the way for a strong argument related to increased funding, education and infrastructure. After the 2000 games, 54 Australian athletes were later awarded part-time scholarships to attend the Australian Institute of Sport. The value of these scholarships was approximately $1000 and recognised the value of Paralympic sport.

Following the Games, the Australian Paralympic Committee (APC) became the legacy recipient of the nation with respect to recognition, funding, sport organisation and capacity development. Attaining this title and the consequent recognition, further resulted in "government funding with a 150% increase" for up to seven years after the Games. This facilitated the mainstreaming of certain aspects of the Paralympic sporting bodies, which were described to have "gained benefits" through better "training, coaching and professional sport organisations". On the other hand, due to competing interests involving individuals without disabilities, the mainstreaming after-effects were also described to be placing a "lower priority for resources" amongst the disabled sporting community. In general, the increased recognition provided an opportunity to target diverse demographics amongst coaches, teachers, students and the public, by "delivering disability education programmes" to approximately 39,000 individuals.

In 2009, the Australian Paralympics Committee (APC) established the Australian Centre for Paralympic Studies (ACPS) as an initiative to preserve and protect the "historic, sporting and business information" that was acquired through the Paralympic Movement. After its formation, the APC collaborated with the National Library of Australia (NLA) via a formal agreement for the "Paralympic oral history project", to capture and promote the preservation of Australian "history and sporting culture". In general, this collaboration occurred in September 2010, to "mark the 50th anniversary of the Paralympic Games", and the project involved conducting interviews of athletes who participated in the first Games in 1960. This led to the recording of "66 interviews" which initially focused on the first Paralympians. Some of these interviews featured individuals who were described to have played "key roles" in the Australian Paralympic movement’s development. This included Anne Green, who was a Paralympics swimming coach and administrator, and the captain of his team at the 1968 Games, Dr. John Yeo. With time, this was followed by the project shifting in direction and expanding its focus to involve other athletes as well. However, this attempt has been subjected to criticism by members of the Australian Paralympic Oral History Project, as they hold the view that it is essential for the APC to include "narratives from actual participants", instead of focusing on "proxy or interpretive accounts" from those who are not part of the disabled community.

Twenty years after Australia’s 2000 Paralympic Games, the winning participants reflected on their past and present experiences, describing the event’s impact as one that has strongly shifted "Australia’s perception of disabilities". Former wheelchair racer, Louise Sauvage current focus centres around training, guiding and assisting other Paralympians to "achieve their goals" to contribute to the future of this movement. Tim Matthews, a former relay team member claimed that "there was no doubt the Sydney event was a watershed moment for the disability movement" which extends to the global community. As Tim believes that the disabled community has a "voice and a lot more exposure" today, his priorities centre around "giving back" by training and supporting members of Paralympics Australia, as well as working as a talent spotter for the organisation.

In addition, the Games were utilised as a platform to showcase the culture of Indigenous Australian peoples to participants and audiences from different nations. The culture of the Aboriginal and Torres Strait Islander peoples was described to be "rich", and the SOCOG worked in close collaboration with their communities to display their culture on a global scale, with the attempt to be inclusive in their approach. The SOCOG also worked towards actively engaging Indigenous communities during the Games, to provide them with commercial, promotional, employment, ceremonies and cultural design opportunities. This was actioned by its establishment of a National Indigenous Advisory Committee, which was delegated the responsibility to monitor and review the "cultural content, themes, materials and protocol" with respect to the events. These events ranged from Olympics ceremonies, the Volunteers program, Olympics Arts Festivals, "traditional welcoming ceremonies" to the Olympic Youth Camp. In particular, the Torch Relay was described to have paid a tribute to "many significant" and sacred Indigenous sites. The Relay event both commenced and concluded with the recognition of Aboriginal athletes Nova Peris-Kneebone and Cathy Freeman, respectively. Additionally, in the opening ceremony of the Paralympic Games, the torch was carried by an Indigenous athlete and wheelchair basketball player named Kevin Coombs. Coombs had participated in the first Paralympic Games held in Rome in 1960 and was also assigned the role of serving as team captain during the 1980 Games.

Honouring the athletes
On 31 October, Australia Post began releasing stamps honouring a number of successful Paralympic athletes from the games. Featured on a 45c stamp was Siobhan Paton as the "Paralympian of the Year".

Senator Lundy, on behalf of the Australian Labor Party, congratulated the athletes as well as coaches and supporting staff. She acknowledged the important dedication the athletes showed in making the games 'the best ever'."Most of all I would like to acknowledge all of those athletes who went out there to strive for their personal best and achieved it. Not every sport records the personal best outcomes, but I know that an incredible number of athletes in their endeavours over the last two weeks did achieve their personal best and will hold that memory in their hearts forever.''"
Kate Lundy, Senator.

Athlete testimonials
Louise Sauvage later wrote of the 2000 Summer Paralympics and said: 
"Never in my years as a wheelchair racer had I experienced anything like the tremendous blast of noise and energy that swept me home to an Olympic gold medal that Sydney evening - Thursday 28 September 2000. And I probably never will again. After more races than I can begin to remember, this was a once-in-a-lifetime event. I learned that night that a crowd of 110,000 in a great stadium can muster an amazing physicality when it is willing someone to win. Making my challenge with 150 metres to go, out in Lane Three on the brick-red Stadium Australia track, I felt as if I were almost picked up and carried along by the roar of the crowd, the breath of the crowd. They propelled me to the line … to the gold. Only later was I told of how many people had risen to their feet almost as one, clambering on seats, to add their determination to my own in that 800 metres final. I will never forget the feeling that night, the 'rush' that supported my charge in the home straight. It is not easy to put into words"

Kurt Fearnley looked back at his success during his debut games:
"I debuted in the 2000 Sydney Paralympics, in front of family, friends and just about every person who had carried me to the start line. But the support within the Australian Paralympic team was the real game changer for me. The current Australian Paralympic legends opened up their homes to me, gave me much-needed equipment and helped me understand the significance of what it is that we do. We look after each other. We are responsible for leaving the sport stronger than when we started. We are not strong despite our disability, we are strong because of it. We are proud men and women with disability, who choose to test our levels of functionality to the extreme."

Games outcomes 
By nature, and based on "conventional wisdom", the Paralympic Games provided a platform for Sydney’s disabled community to be granted the opportunity for a "lasting legacy" of an increased degree of disability awareness and the development of accessible infrastructure, which would ultimately improve the demographic’s socioeconomic status. To achieve such outcomes, the OCA was delegated the role of "developing a sustainable long-term plan" in relation to design, construction and the overall operation of the venues. This was in response to the limited accessibility issue faced by the disabled community. Roles including the distribution of event information, ticketing and entire operation of the Games were conducted by the Sydney Organising Committee for the Olympic Games (SOCOG) and Sydney Paralympic Organising Committee (SPOC).

Overall, the OCA undertook its responsibility by developing Access Guidelines, forming a body known as the Olympic Access Advisory Committee to specifically devise plans for disability and access issues, tailor-making an access guide for the Games and providing a critical written reflection on the event’s access operations. As majority of the sporting events occurred at Sydney Olympic Park, the delivery of these enhancements for the disabled community was described as an "example of world best practice", and the venue has been regarded as the "premier access precinct in Australia".

For example, prior to the Games, Sydney’s public transport system was not accessible to the disabled population, as "0% of public and private buses were accessible" and "less than 5% of rail stations accessible". The Olympic Roads and Transport Authority (ORTA) was formed to plan, enable and maintain coordination between OCA, SOCOG and transport authorities. In response to the gap in accessing the public transport system, the ORTA was required to fulfil its role, however, minimal work was "undertaken to improve the access situation" in preparation for the Games.

After the games, the Paralympic mascot 'Lizzie' was made available for the Australian public to purchase through Franklin stores. The Australian Paralympic Committee successfully claimed the rights to the mascot following the breakup of the SPOC. The APC saw value in the continuation and retention of the mascot in the community.

Prime Minister at the time John Howard announced increased government funding for Paralympic sport in the future. On 23 October 2000, the Sydney Morning Herald reported that Howard had committed to proving the Paralympians the same percentage increase as the Olympians.

Involvement of the NSW Government 
The Olympic Co-ordination Authority (OCA) holds the view that measuring the "success" of the Games is not confined to the "performance of Games venues and events", but also entails the "festive atmosphere, access, ease of movement, security and urban amenity" which shape the overall experience of tourists, local residents and participants. To fund and regulate the entire experience, the NSW government established bodies such as OCA, SPOC and SOCOG. Although SPOC and SOCOG are independent and unique entities, they are similar in function and complement one another. Due to this, "economies of scale" and operational efficiencies have been accomplished by collaboration between "operational methods and personnel". The NSW Government’s involvement in conducting sporting events and providing public services was fully coordinated by the OCA. Additionally, the OCA was responsible for managing the "Government’s relationship" with the other actively involved organisations, SPOC and SOCOG, as well as providing the NSW Government with ongoing reports about the expenditures. The Government also created and funded other organisations to cater for all aspects of the Games such as health, water management, transport and security. For example, the purpose of the Olympic Security Command Centre (OSCC) was to assign a "security and intelligence team" from NSW Police with the responsibility of meeting security requirements through organisation, preparation and management.

See also
2000 Summer Paralympics
Australia at the 2000 Summer Olympics
Images of the Australian Team at the 2000 Summer Paralympics

References

External links

International Paralympic Committee Historical Results Database
 Australian 2000 Paralympic Team archived on Pandora website

Nations at the 2000 Summer Paralympics
Paralympics
2000